Portsmouth Harbor Lighthouse is a historic lighthouse located within Fort Constitution in New Castle, New Hampshire, United States.

History
The station was established in 1771 and was the 10th of 11 light stations established prior to the American Revolution. The first tower was a shingled wooden structure with an iron lantern and copper roof. Its light source was three copper oil lamps.

Three years later, in 1854, the tower was fitted with a Fourth (4th) Order Fresnel lens.

In 1878, a new  cast-iron, brick-lined lighthouse tower was erected on the same foundation as the 1804 tower. When the new tower was completed, the surrounding remains of the 1804 tower were removed.

The light is made green by an acrylic cylinder that surrounds the lens.

Other structures at the light station that are still standing are the 1903 oil house (restored in 2004) and the 1872 keeper's house (currently United States Coast Guard offices).

The lighthouse was added to National Register of Historic Places in 2009.

Friends of Portsmouth Harbor Lighthouses
Founded in 2001, the Friends of Portsmouth Harbor Lighthouses are a chapter of the American Lighthouse Foundation (ALF). The mission of the Friends is to work for the preservation of Portsmouth Harbor Lighthouse and associated structures, as well as to gather and preserve the history of the important historic site and to share these resources with the public. The United States Coast Guard owns Portsmouth Harbor Lighthouse and still maintains the active aids to navigation equipment. The group is licensed through ALF to care for the tower, oil house, and wooden walkway. As of November 2008, the Friends are also responsible for Whaleback Lighthouse, and altered the chapter name to reflect this.

Ghost Hunters investigation
In October 2008, the Ghost Hunters team of Jason Hawes, Grant Wilson, and others investigated possible paranormal activity at the lighthouse, keeper's house, and Fort Constitution. The episode aired December 10, 2008, on the Sci Fi Channel.

This investigation came almost two years after the independent TV show Scared! filmed at the Portsmouth Lighthouse. The two episodes of the two different shows both featured investigations of the lighthouse as well as the keeper's house and the nearby Fort Constitution. Jeremy D'Entremont of the Friends of Portsmouth Harbor Lighthouse provided on- and off-screen history for both shows.

See also
National Register of Historic Places listings in Rockingham County, New Hampshire

References

External links

Friends of Portsmouth Harbor Lighthouses
American Lighthouse Foundation
SCARED! at the Portsmouth Harbor Lighthouse

Lighthouses completed in 1771
Towers completed in 1771
Lighthouses completed in 1878
Transportation buildings and structures in Rockingham County, New Hampshire
Reportedly haunted locations in New Hampshire
Tourist attractions in Rockingham County, New Hampshire
Lighthouses on the National Register of Historic Places in New Hampshire
National Register of Historic Places in Rockingham County, New Hampshire
New Castle, New Hampshire
1771 establishments in New Hampshire